The 1874 Delaware gubernatorial election was held on November 3, 1874. Incumbent Democratic Governor James Ponder was unable to seek re-election. Former county judge John P. Cochran ran as the Democratic nominee to succeed Ponder and faced the Republican nominee, Dr. Isaac Jump. Cochran ultimately defeated Jump, but by a significantly reduced margin from 1870.

General election

Results

References

Bibliography
 
 
 
 Delaware House Journal, 75th General Assembly, 1st Reg. Sess. (1875).

1874
Delaware
Gubernatorial